Lieutenant-Colonel George Windsor-Clive (6 April 1878 – 25 June 1968)  was a Conservative Party politician elected as the Member of Parliament for Ludlow between 1923 and 1945.

Personal
He was the son of Lt.-Col. Hon. George Herbert Windsor-Clive and Hon. Gertrude Albertina Trefusis.

References

1878 births
1968 deaths
Conservative Party (UK) MPs for English constituencies
UK MPs 1924–1929
UK MPs 1929–1931
UK MPs 1931–1935
UK MPs 1935–1945